Paul Saagpakk  (2 September 1910 in Mustjala Parish, Saaremaa, Estonia – 23 February 1996 in Kuressaare, Saaremaa) was an Estonian linguist who compiled a standard reference dictionary of the Estonian language, a work that renders 500,000 Estonian expressions into English.

From 1935, he worked as an English teacher in Tallinn, in 1944 fled the Soviet occupation of Estonia to Sweden and in 1947 moved to the US. He taught English at the University of Massachusetts Amherst.

In 1996 he was awarded the Order of the National Coat of Arms for his achievements.

References

1910 births
1996 deaths
People from Saaremaa Parish
People from the Governorate of Livonia
Linguists from Estonia
Estonian lexicographers
Estonian World War II refugees
University of Tartu alumni
Estonian emigrants to the United States
Recipients of the Order of the National Coat of Arms, 4th Class
20th-century linguists
20th-century lexicographers